A statue of Christopher Columbus in Yonkers, New York, was decapitated in 2017.

See also

 List of monuments and memorials to Christopher Columbus

References

Buildings and structures in Yonkers, New York
Monuments and memorials in New York (state)
Sculptures of men in New York (state)
Statues in New York (state)
Yonkers
Vandalized works of art in New York (state)